The presence of Swiss people in Italy is especially on the border, Campione d'Italia and in Milan.

Numbers
In 2021 in Italy there are 8,153 regular citizens from Switzerland. The three cities with most number of Swiss people are: Milan, Rome and Florence.

Between 2008 and 2019 1,723 Swiss citizens acquired Italian citizenship.

Notable Swiss people in Italy

 Oscar Collodo (1958), rugby footballer
 Michelle Hunziker (1977), television presenter, model, actress
 Stephan Lichtsteiner (1984), footballer
 Michel Morganella (1989), footballer

See also
 Italian immigration to Switzerland
 Swiss Italian

References

Ethnic groups in Italy
Swiss diaspora